Louis Lallemant (Châlons-en-Champagne 1578 – 5 April 1635 in Bourges) was a French Jesuit.

After making his studies under the Fathers of the Society of Jesus, Lallemant entered that order in 1605 in Nancy. Having completed the usual course of study at the University of Pont-à-Mousson, he taught at the Jesuit colleges in La Flèche, Bourges and Rouen. He was ordained and taught philosophy for some time until in 1622 he was made master of novices, an office he filled for four years. He then became professor of theology at Clermont College in Paris. In 1628 he was appointed director of tertians, and as such, was responsible for the final year of formation for close to sixty Jesuits between 1628 and 1631. After three years in this post he broke down in health, and was sent to the college of Bourges, in the hope that change of occupation would restore him. The hope was not to be fulfilled; he died after a few months. 

Lallemant has been called the Balthazar Alvarez of France; his ideals and efforts to meet them were as uncompromising as the latter's. Like Alvarez, Lallemant expected of others what he did himself. He set the high ideal before his disciples, especially the Fathers of the third probation (Third Year), and required them to rise to such ideals. Lallemant was critical of those Jesuits so busy with work and study that they found no time for prayer. In reaction to what he perceived as overly secular aspirations on the part of some of his colleagues, Lallemant tended to emphasize the contemplative life over the active apostolate.

He is known today chiefly by his “Doctrine Spirituelle”, a collection of his maxims and instructions gathered together by Father Jean Rigoleuc, one of his disciples, and detailing very thoroughly his spiritual method.

References

Sources
CHAMPION, Pierre - La Doctrine Spirituelle du P. Louis Lallemant (Paris, 1694), ?preceded by a life of Lallemant?
LALLEMANT, Louis. The Spiritual Doctrine of Father Louis Lallemant of the Company of Jesus: Preceded by Some Account of His Life. Edited by Frederick William Faber. Spiritual Doctrine Of Fr Louis Lallemant. Portman Square, London, Britain: Burns & Lambert, 17th Portman Street, 1855. https://archive.org/details/SpiritualDoctrineOfFrLouisLallemant/page/n7/mode/2up.
GUILHERMY, Menologie de l’Assistance de France, 5 April ???? 
PATRIGNANI, Menologio della Compagnia di Gesu. 

HENRY WOODS Transcribed by Joseph E. O’Connor
WORCESTER, SJ, Thomas, ed. The Cambridge Encyclopedia of the Jesuits. Cambridge: Cambridge University Press, 2017. doi:10.1017/9781139032780.

17th-century French Jesuits
17th-century French Catholic theologians
17th-century Christian mystics
Roman Catholic mystics
French educators
1578 births
1635 deaths